Aethria hampsoni is a moth of the subfamily Arctiinae. It was described by Paul Dognin in 1902. It is found in Venezuela.

References

Moths described in 1902
Arctiinae
Moths of South America